A Wife by Proxy is a 1917 American silent drama film directed by John H. Collins and starring Mabel Taliaferro, Robert Walker and Sally Crute.

Cast
 Mabel Taliaferro as 'Jerry' McNairn 
 Robert Walker as Norton Burbeck 
 Sally Crute as Beatrice Gaden 
 Fred Jones as Frederick Gaden 
 Yale Benner as Howard Curtis
 George D. Melville as Timothy McNairn
 Ricca Allen as Scraggs (housekeeper) 
 Jerome N. Wilson as Guyler (Burbeck's lawyer) 
 Edward Mack as Flynn (the butler)

References

Bibliography
 Lowe, Denise. An Encyclopedic Dictionary of Women in Early American Films: 1895-1930. Routledge, 2014.

External links
 

1917 films
1917 drama films
1910s English-language films
American silent feature films
Silent American drama films
American black-and-white films
Films directed by John H. Collins
Metro Pictures films
1910s American films